Laboratório Nacional de Luz Síncrotron (LNLS) is the Brazilian Synchrotron Light Laboratory, a research institution on physics, chemistry, material science and life sciences. It is located in the city of Campinas, sub-district of Barão Geraldo, state of São Paulo, Brazil.

The Center, which is operated by the Brazilian Center of Research in Energy and Materials (CNPEM) under a contract with the National Research Council (CNPq) and the Ministry of Science and Technology of Brazil, has the only particle accelerator (a synchrotron) in Latin America, which was designed and built in Brazil by a team of physicists, technicians and engineers.

Currently, the Brazilian Synchrotron has 15 different beamlines in operation for its user community, covering energies ranging from a few electronvolts to tens of kiloelectronvolts. The uses include:
X-Ray Diffraction
Macromolecule Crystallography
Small Angle X-Ray Scattering
X-Ray Absorption and Fluorescence Spectroscopy
UV and Soft X-Ray Spectroscopy
depending on the beamline used.

In current production is the Sirius Project, a plan for a 3 GeV synchrotron light source. The groundbreaking ceremony took place in May 2013. The plan includes an initial 13 beamlines, with a final goal of 40, ranging from 10 eV to 100 keV. It is being built next to the current CNPEM campus. It was inaugurated in 2018.

References

External links
Official LNLS Home Page
Lightsources.org
Sirius Project - LNLS

Research institutes in Brazil
Organisations based in Campinas
Synchrotron radiation facilities